The 1987 Full Members' Cup final was the final match of the second edition of the Full Members' Cup football tournament and was contested between First Division team Charlton Athletic and Second Division side Blackburn Rovers. The match was won 1–0 by Blackburn with the winning goal scored by Colin Hendry.

Route to the Final

Blackburn Rovers: Blackburn defeated Huddersfield Town, Sheffield United, Oxford United and Chelsea to reach the semi-finals, where they defeated Ipswich Town 3–0 to reach the final.
Charlton Athletic: Charlton defeated Birmingham City, Bradford City and Everton to reach the semi-finals, where they defeated Norwich City 2–1 (aet) to reach the final.

Match details

References

Full Members' Cup 1987
Full Members' Cup 1987
Full Members' Cup Finals
1986–87 in English football
March 1987 sports events in the United Kingdom
1987 sports events in London